State Road 292 (SR 292) is a major thoroughfare in the Pensacola, Florida metropolitan area.  Locally, it is known as Pace Boulevard, Barrancas Avenue, Gulf Beach Highway, Sorrento Road, and Perdido Key Drive.

Route description

State Road 292 begins on Perdido Key at a signalized pedestrian crosswalk along the Alabama-Florida state line at the east end of Alabama State Route 182, where the state line itself is used as a tourist attraction and is home to the Flora-Bama bar and dance club. The street name changes from Perdido Beach Boulevard in Alabama to Perdido Key Drive in Florida. At the Perdido Skye Condominiums, the road starts to curve more towards the northeast where it intersects Johnson Beach Road, then runs straight north until it reaches Gongora Drive where it curves northeast. The last intersection on Perdido Key is River Road, and from there it crosses the Theo Baars Bridge (formerly the Gulf Beach Bridge) over the Gulf Intracoastal Waterway. The first major intersection after this bridge is CR 292A (Gulf Beach Highway), which is also shared by Innerarity Point Road. At this intersection, the street name of SR 292 changes from Perdido Key Drive to Sorrento Road. The route curves more towards the northeast only to turn back north again as it crosses a bridge over Bayou Garcon. After the bridge, SR 292 turns north-northeast, and after the Perdido Bay Country Club Estates development, turns northeast, where it has an intersection with CR 293 (Bauer Road). A much more significant intersection is encountered in the form of a four-lane divided state highway known as Florida State Road 173 (Blue Angel Parkway), a local street leading to the Naval Aviation Museum.

CR 292A ends on the south side of the road, which is also where Sorrento Road ends, and SR 292 becomes part of Gulf Beach Highway. A block and a half after this on the opposite side is the southern terminus of CR 297 (Dog Track Road), a road named for the Pensacola Greyhound Track. Crossing a bridge over Soldiers Creek, it enters Beach Haven. The first major intersection in the community is the southern terminus of SR 752, which continues south as a local street called South Fairfield Drive, leading to a local park with the same name. Later in Warrington another major intersection can be found at SR 295 (Navy Boulevard) and Gulf Beach Highway suddenly becomes Barrancas Avenue. The road becomes a four-lane divided highway just before the intersection with Old Barrancas Avenue, then suddenly becomes a six-lane highway wide as it approaches a bridge over Bayou Chico, where it enters the city of Pensacola. SR 292 makes a sharp left turn onto Pace Avenue to the north, while Barrancas Avenue continues to the northeast. After two railroad crossings between West Main Street and West Government Street, the road has a major intersection with West Garden Street, where the western terminus of U.S. Route 98 Business (US 98 Bus.) begins, and eastbound US 98 joins SR 292 in a concurrency. The concurrency ends at and then US 90 (West Cervantes Street), where US 98 joins that route until they reach North Ninth Avenue. SR 295 is encountered a second time at the intersection of West Fairfield Drive. Pace Avenue curves slightly to the northwest then the northeast before finally terminating at US 29, locally known as North Palafox Street.

Major intersections

References

External links

Florida 292 (AARoads)

292
292